Joe or Joseph Connor may refer to:

Joe Connor (baseball) (1874–1957), American baseball player
Joe Connor (footballer, born 1877) (1877–1934), Irish footballer
Joe Connor (footballer, born 1986), English footballer

See also
Joe Connors (1862–1891), American baseball player
Joseph Connors (born 1945), American art historian
Joseph Conners, British professional wrestler
L. Joseph Connors, American politician, lawyer, and businessman